The Hawkinsville and Florida Southern Railway (H&FS) was founded in 1896 and by 1901 was operating  of track from Hawkinsville to Worth, Georgia, United States, where it connected with the Georgia Southern and Florida Railroad. It also operated a  line between Davisville and Fitzgerald, Georgia.  In 1907, a portion of the H&FS was leased to the Gulf Line Railway However, in 1913, the H&FS took over operations and fully absorbed the Gulf Line resulting in a line from Hawkinsville to Camilla, Georgia.  In 1922, the H&FS went bankrupt.  The section from Camilla to Ashburn, Georgia, was purchased by the Georgia, Ashburn, Sylvester and Camilla Railway but no buyers could be found for the remainder of the system and it was abandoned by 1923.

References

Defunct Georgia (U.S. state) railroads
Railway companies established in 1896
Railway companies disestablished in 1922
Predecessors of the Southern Railway (U.S.)